Ivan Laing (18 August 1885 – 30 November 1917) was a Scottish field hockey player who competed in the 1908 Summer Olympics. Born in Hawick, and a member of the Hawick Hockey Club, in 1908 he won the bronze medal as member of the Scotland team. Laing also played rugby for Hawick RFC, and swam for Hawick Amateur Swimming Club.

He was educated at New College, Eastbourne, and at Verviers in Belgium.

Laing was killed in action aged 32 during World War I, serving as a lieutenant with the Coldstream Guards at Metz-en-Couture. He was buried at the Metz-en-Couture Communal Cemetery nearby.

See also
 List of Olympians killed in World War I

References

External links
 
profile

1885 births
1917 deaths
British male field hockey players
British military personnel killed in World War I
Coldstream Guards officers
Field hockey players at the 1908 Summer Olympics
Hawick RFC players
Medalists at the 1908 Summer Olympics
Olympic bronze medallists for Great Britain
Olympic field hockey players of Great Britain
Olympic medalists in field hockey
Sportspeople from Hawick
Scottish male field hockey players
Scottish Olympic medallists
Scottish soldiers